Tiko Airport  is an airport serving Tiko, a town in the Southwest Region of Cameroon.

The Tiko non-directional beacon (Ident: TI) is located on the field.

See also
Transport in Cameroon
List of airports in Cameroon

References

External links
Bing Maps - Tiko
OpenStreetMap - Tiko
OurAirports - Tiko
SkyVector Aeronautical Charts

Airports in Cameroon